Million pound note may refer to:

 The Million Pound Note, a 1954 British film
 The One Million Pound Note, a 1916 Hungarian silent film
 "The Million Pound Bank Note", a short story by Mark Twain